Timothy "Tim" Ballard is a self-styled anti-human trafficking activist and author. He is the founder and CEO of Operation Underground Railroad (O.U.R.), CEO of The Nazarene Fund and the author of several books. Ballard has credited his organization with rescuing thousands of trafficking victims, although his numbers have been disputed, and O.U.R has been criticized for a lack of transparency and exaggerating stories. O.U.R. is the subject of an ongoing investigation by the Davis County Attorney's office. Ballard has faced criticism for broadcasting raids without regards for victim privacy.

Ballard has testified before the United States Congress and has recommended procedures and practices for rescuing children from trafficking rings. 

In 2020, Tim Ballard and Operation Underground Railroad were the subjects of several investigative series that detailed Ballard's relationships with corrupt foreign government officials, his history of fabricating rescues and statistics, and several reports detailing accusations by law enforcement agencies, both foreign and domestic, accusing Ballard of fabricating and exaggerating their relationships. These included multiple accusations that Ballard created and fostered an environment of child sex trafficking, and cited evidence that O.U.R. was an ongoing criminal enterprise since its founding by Ballard.

Biography

Schooling 
After growing up in California, Ballard attended Brigham Young University (BYU) in Provo, Utah. As a member of The Church of Jesus Christ of Latter-day Saints, he went on a church mission to Chile and then graduated cum laude from BYU with a Bachelor of Arts degree in Spanish and Political Science. Then, he graduated summa cum laude from the Monterey Institute of International Studies with a Master of Arts degree in International Politics.

Founding O.U.R. 
In 2013, Ballard founded the non-profit organization Operation Underground Railroad, or O.U.R. He has briefed politicians on the issue of child sex trafficking, including President Donald Trump in January 2019.

Ballard trained Imperial County Sheriff’s Office personnel in the use of data mining software that led to the arrest of a man suspected of distributing child pornography.

Testifying before Congress 
On May 14, 2015, Ballard was asked to testify before the United States Congress. The House Foreign Affairs Subcommittee on Global Human Rights held a hearing on the partnerships between U.S. government and non-governmental organizations that rescue trafficking victims. On March 6, 2019, Ballard was called to testify before the US Senate Judiciary Committee concerning US-Mexico border security and its relation to child sex trafficking.

Presidential appointment 
In 2019 Ballard was appointed to the White House Public-Private Partnership Advisory Council to End Human Trafficking.  The Council was terminated on September 30, 2020.

Media 
In 2016, The Abolitionists, a documentary produced by Gerald Molen, featured the first operations undertaken by Ballard and Operation Underground Railroad. Another documentary from director Nick Nanton, Operation Toussaint, was produced in 2018 which featured an operation in Haiti that had the support of Haitian President Jovenel Moïse and former US congresswoman Mia Love of Utah. A feature film about Ballard's life, Sound of Freedom, starring Jim Caviezel, Mira Sorvino, and Eduardo Verástegui was announced in 2018. The 2018 documentary, Operation Toussaint, and the 2020 documentary, Triple Take, were also based on Ballard's work against sex trafficking. 

ESPN featured Ballard and Pittsburgh Steelers' head coach Mike Tomlin in a piece which highlighted the restavek issue near the border of Haiti and the Dominican Republic. Tomlin would also write the foreword to Ballard's book Slave Stealers: True Accounts of Slave Rescues – Then and Now.

A 2020, Vice News investigation found that the organization employed "a pattern of image-burnishing and mythology-building, a series of exaggerations that are, in the aggregate, quite misleading". For instance, O.U.R. claimed that it rescued a woman named "Liliana", however, Ballard testified in court that she escaped herself and his organization is caring for her. The organization's spending also lacks transparency. A 2021 follow-up article further criticized O.U.R.'s practices, which included using inexperienced donors and celebrities as part of its "jump team", a lack of meaningful surveillance or identification of targets, failing to validate whether the people they intended to rescue were in fact actual trafficking victims, and conflating consensual sex work with sex trafficking.

Ballard and supporters of O.U.R. have been criticized for promoting the far-right QAnon conspiracy theory. Ballard has denied any association with QAnon.

Criminal Investigation 
On August 27, 2020, Lynn Packer with American Crime Journal presented the findings of his investigation into Ballard and O.U.R. He reported criminal complaints had been forwarded to the Davis County District Attorney at their office in Farmington, Utah. Packer was later interviewed by American psychologist and podcaster John Dehlin. Dehlin asked why such a major "development for the state of Utah and the LDS Church" was not released or "being pursued" by mainstream Utah press. Packer asserted that Utah media and the LDS Church were complicit in legitimizing Operation Underground Railroad with little to no oversight and fact-checking. Packer revealed that he had spent the last five years investigating Tim Ballard and Operation Underground Railroad and anyone who spends more than five minutes looking into the organization could find fraud and corruption.

In October 2020, the Attorney's Office of Davis County, Utah stated that O.U.R. and Tim Ballard were under criminal investigation regarding complaints that O.U.R. had conducted illegal fundraising efforts. Investigative journalists Anna Merlan and Tim Marchmann for Vice News confirmed reports by investigative journalist Lynn Packer and Damion Moore of American Crime Journal of a clandestine meeting held in August 2019, where Ballard summoned officers and managers of his non-profit and for-profit businesses, including several from Operation Underground Railroad. At the meeting he presented in detail a criminal conspiracy to launder donor money from non-profits into his for-profit businesses.

Books 
Ballard has written a number of books including The Covenant: One Nation Under God, and its sequel, The Covenant, Lincoln, and the War. In 2018 he published the biographical book Slave Stealers: True Accounts of Slave Rescues – Then and Now, which details his experience forming a non-profit to rescue children. The book also draws a few parallels to 19th century American history and the transatlantic slave trade. The principal subject is a 19th century abolitionist named Harriet Jacobs and her struggles to escape slavery and save her children.

Awards 
In 2017, Ballard won the 2017 Social Entrepreneur Award at the Ernst & Young Entrepreneur of the Year Award 2017 Utah Region Awards.

References

External links
 Official website
 Operation Underground Railroad

Living people
American chief executives
American male writers
Anti–human trafficking activists
Brigham Young University alumni
Latter Day Saints from Utah
Mormon missionaries in Chile
People from Provo, Utah
Year of birth missing (living people)